Jack Edward Lozeron (born September 9, 1996), known professionally as JackEL, is a Canadian DJ, record producer and songwriter. He is most notable for a collaboration with Skip Martin on an album titled EDM Lounge and his performance at EDC Las Vegas in 2019.

Early life and education
Lozeron grew up in Edmonton, Alberta, Canada. He also briefly lived in New Orleans as a child, where he would frequently watch street performers at Bourbon Street. He was inspired to play EDM by listening to Deadmau5's music. He began DJing in local venues  in his hometown of Edmonton at the age of 14. At the age of 16, he moved to Las Vegas to pursue his music career.

Career
JackEL released his first single at the age of 16, a collaboration with rapper Mims titled, "Too Young to Die."

JackEL was the featured artist in Sparx Entertainment's January 2015 "UNCENSORED" article series. In 2015, he also formed a duo with musician Nikki Phoenix, collaborating on tracks such as "Your Smile" and "Ballroom Zombie."

JackEL founded the record label FVYDID in 2016. JackEL and ZaZa Maree performed the song at the 350th Hunnypot Live event at The Mint music club in Los Angeles.

In 2017, JackEL collaborated with RV3RS and General Jah Mikey on the track "Rootz ". RV3RS also teamed with JackEL and Zaddy Babby on the track “Do It Again,” which was released in 2022.  JackEL also opened for Afrojack at the Grave Digger's Ball 2017 in South Carolina.  JackEL also collaborated with Trice Be Phantom Magnetiq on the song “Sunshine.”

In 2019, JackEL collaborated with Skip Martin on a 16-track album titled EDM Lounge. He also performed at Electric Daisy Carnival Las Vegas in 2019.

JackEL also collaborated with Anthony Oak and Trice Be on the track "NØ MØRE" (2020). He also collaborated with Bobby Duque and Britt Lari on the single “Get This Right.”

JackEL contributed the track "Feel the Love" to Hood Politics Records' compilation album Hood Poli Summer of Love in July 2021. In 2021, JackEL also collaborated with Las Vegas-based musician Jenna Jay on a remix of her song "Someone Real." In the same year, JackEL collaborated with rapper Slicklife on the song “Cutt the Check. JackEL was also one of the artists who performed at the 2021 Canadian Music Week music festival.

JackEL also performed at the Neon Dream Dance Music Festival in Las Vegas in 2022. DJ and production duo Eflorem released an official remix of JackEL’s song “We Belong” in 2022.

Other artists JackEL has worked with include Mims and Beenie Man. He also produced two records for rapper Dizzy Wright.

Discography

Albums

EPs

Selected Singles

References

1996 births
Living people
Canadian DJs
Canadian record producers